is a Japanese video game developer based in Tokyo, Japan. The company is composed mostly of ex-Human Entertainment members, including Hifumi Kono, who directed the first two titles in the Clock Tower series of horror games. Nude Maker has been contracted by companies including Capcom, Grasshopper Manufacture, PlatinumGames, Sega, and Konami.

Games developed

References

External links
 

Japanese companies established in 2002
Video game companies established in 2002
Video game companies of Japan
Video game development companies